Phetchabun Football Club (Thai สโมสรฟุตบอลจังหวัดเพชรบูรณ์) is a Thailand semi professional football club based in Phetchabun Province. They currently play in Thai Football Amateur Tournament.

Stadium and locations

Season by season record

P = Played
W = Games won
D = Games drawn
L = Games lost
F = Goals for
A = Goals against
Pts = Points
Pos = Final position

QR1 = First Qualifying Round
QR2 = Second Qualifying Round
R1 = Round 1
R2 = Round 2
R3 = Round 3
R4 = Round 4

R5 = Round 5
R6 = Round 6
QF = Quarter-finals
SF = Semi-finals
RU = Runners-up
W = Winners

Players

Current squad

References

 http://www.smmsport.com/m/article.php?a=2017
 http://www.thailive.net/2016/09/03/%E0%B8%A3%E0%B9%88%E0%B8%A7%E0%B8%87%E0%B8%AD%E0%B8%B5%E0%B8%81-%E0%B8%AA%E0%B8%B4%E0%B8%99%E0%B8%98%E0%B8%99%E0%B8%B2-%E0%B9%80%E0%B8%9E%E0%B8%8A%E0%B8%A3%E0%B8%9A%E0%B8%B9%E0%B8%A3%E0%B8%93/
 http://www.kondivision2.com/content-9085.html  
 Phetchabun news

External links 
official page

Association football clubs established in 2009
Football clubs in Thailand
Phetchabun province
2009 establishments in Thailand